Isabella Foster Rogers Kells (15 April 1861 – 12 July 1938) was a New Zealand teacher, postmistress and community leader. She was born in East Tāmaki, Auckland, New Zealand, on 15 April 1861.

Biography
Isabella Foster Rogers Kells was the fifth child of parents Eliza Forbes and George Kells.

References

1861 births
1938 deaths
New Zealand educators
People from Auckland